SoundApp is a freeware audio player for the Classic Mac OS.  It was among the earliest MP3 players for the Classic Mac OS, and was widely praised for its ability to play back, and convert between, a variety of audio file formats.

The program appears to have been abandoned by its creator, Norman Franke, after the release of SoundApp 2.7.3.  Franke's reasons for abandoning the project have never been made public, and SoundApp has never been ported to Mac OS X.

Another developer, Joachim Bengtsson / Third Cog Software, has begun a version for Mac OS X, "SoundApp Reborn", but this project does not use any of Franke's original code. As of 2017, SoundApp Reborn is at version 0.1.1 and supports audio playback but not conversion and does not incorporate all of SoundApp's features.

Features

Audio formats
 AIFF and AIFF-C
 Amiga IFF (8SVX)
 Audio CD Tracks
 AVR
 DVI ADPCM
 EPOC 32 (Psion Series 5)
 GSM 06.10
 IMA ADPCM
 IRCAM
 MIDI
 Amiga MOD
 MPEG Audio (including MP3)
 PARIS
 PSION sound
 QuickTime Movies
 Sound Blaster VOC
 Sound Designer and Sound Designer II
 SoundCap
 SoundEdit
 Sun Audio (AU) and NeXT
 Studio Session Instrument
 System 7 and SND files
 Windows WAV

References

External links
 SoundApp home page
 Download page at mac.org
 Stereo Society review of SoundApp
 Page discussing the demise of SoundApp

Classic Mac OS media players
Freeware
1993 software